The Canon EOS M6 Mark II is a digital mirrorless interchangeable-lens camera announced by Canon on August 28, 2019, and released in September 2019. As with all of the Canon EOS M series cameras, the Canon EOS M6 Mark II uses the Canon EF-M lens mount. The M6 Mark II is the successor of both the M5 (2016) and the M6 (2017).

The characteristic basic features are the same as with the M6: the camera lacks a built-in viewfinder. Users can purchase an additional electronic viewfinder (Canon EVF-DC1 or -DC2) which costs 200 euros or more; it is included in some bundles with body and kit lens. The camera has a tilt screen. It can be articulated upwards, so that the user can see themselves in the screen. For sound, the camera has dual microphones equating to stereo audio recording but it also has a 3.5 mm microphone connection for external microphones, but no headphone port.

The Canon EOS M6 Mark II can record video with 4K up to 29.97 fps and 1080p at up to 119.88 fps but in this mode the cameras dual-pixel auto-focus is unavailable. When released, the camera could not record 24 (23.97) fps 4K video; this was added in a firmware update.  Older production cameras can be updated with a free download from Canon's website.

Key features 

 Canon EF-M lens mount
 32.5  megapixel dual-pixel, APS-C, CMOS sensor
 Video can be recorded with 4K at 29.97 fps, 1080p up to 119.88.
 ISO 100 – 25600 (extended to 51200)
 Dual Pixel CMOS autofocus
 1.04M-dot tilting rear articulating touchscreen
 Microphone input (3.5mm)
 Intervalometer port (2.5mm)
 USB-C Data Transfer port

References

External links 

 EOS M6 Mark II EF-M 15-45mm IS STM Kit Black
 Canon EOS M6 II initial review: What's new and how it compares

Canon EF-M-mount cameras
Cameras introduced in 2019